Tulcea (also known by other alternative names) is a city in Northern Dobruja, Romania. It is the administrative center of Tulcea County, and had a population of 73,707 . One village, Tudor Vladimirescu, is administered by the city.

Names 
The city is known in Bulgarian, Russian and Ukrainian as Тулча, romanized: Tulcha; in Greek as Αιγισσός, romanized: Aigissós; in Hungarian as Tulcsa; and in Turkish as Tulça.

History 

Tulcea was founded in the 7th century B.C. under the name of Aegyssus, mentioned in the documents of Procopius and Diodorus of Sicily (3rd century BC). In his Ex Ponto, Ovid recorded a local tradition that ascribed its name to a mythical founder, Aegisos the Caspian.

After the fighting from 1215 AD the Romans conquered the town. They rebuilt it after their plans, their technique and architectural vision, reorganizing it. The fortified town was mentioned as late as the 10th century, in documents such as Notitia Episcopatuum or De Thematibus.

Under Byzantine rule beginning with the 5th century AD the town was abandoned by the first half of the 7th century due to the Barbarian invasions. The former settlement's territory fell under the rule of the Bulgarian Empire (681-c.1000; 1185-14th century). Inhabitation was restored in the second half of the 10th century, as the Byzantines built a fortress on the spot after reconquering the region. The fortress was soon destroyed in 1064 by an attack of the Uzes, however some inhabitation continued. A settlement, larger than the one in the 11th century, is archaeologically attested beginning with the 14th century. The Ottoman rule was imposed around 1420, and would last for the following four centuries.

The town was first documented under its modern name in 1506, in the Ottoman customs records. On that occasion it was described as an "important centre for the transit trade".

Around 1848, it was still a small shipyard city, being awarded city status in 1860, when it became a province capital. It became a sanjak centre in Silistre Eyaleti in 1860 and Tuna Vilayeti in 1864.

In 1853, The Times of London noted that "Toultcha" was "the last fortified place held by the Turks on the Danube, and which has a garrison of 1,200 men."

During the Russo-Turkish War of 1877–1878, Northern Dobruja and specially Tulcea would be the sites of massacres and conflicts between Muslim Circassians and Christian Bulgarians, Russians and Ukrainians. The Circassians of Dobruja had settled there in 1864 after the Circassian genocide, and through their raids to other peoples of the region and handing over part of their gains to the Ottoman authorities, they would end up indirectly financing the construction of buildings that still stand in Tulcea today: the modern Tulcea Art Museum and the Azizyie Mosque. The Dobrujan Circassians were expelled from the region after the end of the war.

In 1878, after the end of the war, Tulcea was awarded to Romania, together with the rest of Northern Dobruja (see Congress of Berlin). Tulcea was occupied by the Central Powers between 1916–1918 during World War I, and became part of their condominium following the Treaty of Bucharest in May 1918 (until November 1918).  During that time, the statue of Mircea the Elder was taken down by Bulgarian troops, since during his reign Dobruja was incorporated into Wallachia.

Demographics
According to the 2011 census, Tulcea has a population of 73,707 inhabitants, 93.2% of which are ethnic Romanian. Significant minority groups include Lipovans (2.6%), Roma (1.4%) and Turks (1.2%).
Most of the indigenous Bulgarians left the town in 1941 in accordance with the Treaty of Craiova.

Culture
Tulcea is the site of the "George Georgescu Contest", a music competition created by teachers at the Tulcea Arts High School and held annually since 1992.  Named in honor of the conductor George Georgescu (1887–1964), an important figure in the development of Romanian classical music who was born in the Tulcea county, the contest was at first open only to Romanian music school and high school students but began admitting international students in 1995.  Organizers include the Romanian Ministry of Education and Youth, the Education Board of Tulcea County, the Tulcea County Council, the Tulcea Mayoralty, and surviving members of Georgescu's family.

The Monument of Independence represents one of the main attractions of the city, because of its placement and of the panoramic view that it offers. It is located on the same hill as the ruins of Aegyssus and the history museum. The monument itself is represented by an obelisk with a statue of an eagle on one side and the statue of a soldier on the other. The monument was erected to commemorate the War of Independence that made Dobruja part of Romania. Construction began on 17 October 1879, in the presence of Prince Carol I of Romania.

The main high school is the Spiru Haret Dobrujan College.

Notable people

 Crin Antonescu, former President of the Senate of Romania and acting President of Romania in 2012
 Georges Boulanger, violinist
 Alexandru Ciucurencu, painter
 Stefan Karadzha, Bulgarian revolutionary, studied in Tulcea and is associated with the town
 Grigore Moisil, mathematician
 Dimitar Petkov, Bulgarian Prime Minister
 Mirela Roznoveanu, literary critic, writer, and journalist
 Valentin Serbu, writer
 Tora Vasilescu, actress

Twin towns – sister cities 

Tulcea is twinned with:

  Aalborg, Denmark
  Altena, Netherlands
  Amasya, Turkey
  Aprilia, Italy
  Fratta Polesine, Italy
  Ilion, Greece
  Izmail, Ukraine
  Larnaca, Cyprus
  Mudanya, Turkey
  Rovigo, Italy
  Shumen, Bulgaria

References
Notes

Bibliography
 Brătianu, G. I. Les Bulgares à Cetatea Albă (Akkerman) au debut du XIVeme siècle-Byz, 2, 1926, 153-168
 Laiou, A. E. Constantinople and the Latins (Foreign Policy of Andronicus II, 1282–1328). Cambridge, Massachusetts, 1972.
 Nicephorus, p. 34
 Theophanes, p. 357-358

External links

 Tulcea City Hall
 Tulcea County Prefecture
 Tulcea County Council

 
Cities in Romania
Capitals of Romanian counties
Port cities and towns in Romania
Populated places on the Danube
Romania–Ukraine border crossings
Articles containing video clips
Populated places established in the 7th century BC
Byzantine sites in Romania
Populated places in Tulcea County
Localities in Northern Dobruja